A brigade is a military formation utilized by the United States Army since its creation as the Continental Army.  The brigade traces its origins to the British Army of the 15th century as a temporary formation to control multiple regiments when necessary.  The US Army also maintained this status until the middle of the 20th century, when the first permanent brigades were formed.  Traditionally brigades were composed of all one combat arm (infantry, cavalry, etc.) but with their permanent creation they evolved into combined arms formations.  A brigade was historically commanded by a brigadier general and composed of several regiments, but is currently commanded by a colonel and composed of several battalions.  In the US Army, maneuver brigades are composed of combat arms units which directly engage the enemy, while support brigades provide administrative and logistical support.  Between three and six brigades in total form a division.

History

American Civil War
Brigades achieved prominence during the Civil War as over 200 were established by the Union Army to fight the Confederate States Army.  After early experiments at combined arms, all Union brigades consisted of just one combat arm.  Brigades were numbered based on their position within their parent division, but could also acquire nicknames even when this designation changed.  Famous examples included the Iron Brigade and the Irish Brigade.  Brigades also used distinctive identifying flags for the first time during the Civil War.  An initial generic design was eventually replaced with a triangular flag which would have the symbol of their parent corps and be color-coded to designate brigade and division numbering within the corps.

Nominally, brigades were commanded by brigadier generals, but due to gaps in the Union command hierarchy many brigades were instead commanded by the most senior regimental colonel (often breveted to the rank of brigadier general).  Staff officers authorized to a brigade included an assistant adjutant general, an assistant quartermaster/ordnance officer, an assistant commissary of subsistence (all with the rank of Captain) and a surgeon.  However, there were no enlisted personnel assigned to help staff officers carry out their tasks.  Instead, these duties were carried out soldiers and non-commissioned officers detailed from their subordinate units or hired civilian laborers (including so-called "contraband" or freed slaves).
 
Infantry brigades could have as few as two or as many as twelve regiments, though on average they consisted of four regiments.  At minimum Union commanders sought to keep infantry brigades to a strength of at least 2,000 soldiers, which due to an inadequate replacement system often meant adding additional regiments to a brigade.  By the Battle of Chancellorsville in 1863, a 2,000-strong brigade averaged 4.7 regiments, but a year later at the Battle of Cold Harbor such a unit averaged 5.5 regiments.  When a brigade was deployed in a battle line, the standard spacing was twenty-two paces between regiments, although in actual practice such intervals were rarely maintained.  General William T. Sherman believed that a brigade of 3,000 was needed to occupy a front of one mile, though 5,000 or more could be packed into that mile to make the line stronger.

Cavalry brigades could range from two to eight regiments, though like the infantry they too averaged four regiments.  However, early in the war individual cavalry regiments were attached to infantry divisions to be used as their commander saw fit, often as escorts, orderlies and pickets.  It was not until July 1862 when cavalry in the Army of the Potomac were organized into separate brigades, although they remained until army control and often used for the same tasks.  When the Cavalry Corps was formed in February 1863 cavalry were freed to operate as independent units, with three to five brigades forming dedicated cavalry divisions.  

At the start of the war field artillery was not organized into brigades; instead, individual batteries were attached to infantry brigades to provide support.  However this only served to dilute their firepower as demonstrated at the First Battle of Bull Run, after which they were reassigned from brigades to divisions.  By the time of the Battle of Gettysburg artillery was organized into their own brigades, with each army corps assigned one and the rest organized under a general artillery reserve.  Each brigade had anywhere from four to eight batteries, at least one of which was a Regular Army unit, with six being the most common.   Artillery brigades also had their own commanding officer, often a colonel but sometimes a junior officers.  The commander was also authorized a staff of an adjutant, quartermaster, commissary officer, ordnance officer, medical officer and artillery inspector, with one or more assistants assigned to each.

See Also
Brigade insignia of the United States Army
Brigade combat team

References 

 
Brigades of the United States Army